The Little River is a river in the U.S. state of California, whose drainage basin is the largest on the Pacific coast between the Mad River and Big Lagoon. The  river drains the forested Franciscan assemblage of the California Coast Ranges.

The lowermost mile of channel is through Quaternary alluvium and dune sand of an estuarine floodplain typical of coastal inlets along the Cascadia subduction zone. Land seaward of U.S. Route 101 forms Little River State Beach and Clam Beach County Park. Little River State Park was established in 1931. The floodplain upstream of the Highway 101 bridge is cleared as grazing pasture, and the upland portion of the drainage basin, including the former company town of Crannell, is in private ownership growing forest products. In 2014, the North Coast regional water board recommended that the Little River be listed as an impaired waterway due to E. coli contamination 600 times greater than normal.

References

See also
List of rivers in California

Rivers of Humboldt County, California
Rivers of Northern California